Ayatollah Morteza Moghtadai (مرتضی مقتدایی) (born 12 October 1935 in Isfahan, Iran) is an Iranian Shia scholar, and deputy chairman of Society of Seminary Teachers of Qom. He was re-elected to the fourth Assembly of Experts. He currently resides in Isfahan and teaches in the city's seminary.

He was quoted  as saying of the 2009 Iranian election protests that the "demonstrators were treading the path of the world's arrogance" and that "The regime must confront them".

Biography 
Moghtadaei was born in 1935 in Isfahan Hakim Mosque District. His father, Mirza Mahmoud Moghtadaei of Clergymen of that  time was a disciple of Abdul-Karim Ha'eri Yazdi and Ruhollah Khomeini and Mohaghegh Damad, Syed Ahmad Zanjani."

Responsibilities 

Some of his responsibilities after the revolution are as follows:

 Islamic Revolution Court judge
 Member and spokesman of the Supreme Judicial Council
 Chairman of the Supreme Court
 Chairman of the Supreme Court and prosecutor general
 Membership in the Society of Seminary Teachers of Qom
 Member of the Supreme Council of the Qom Seminary
 Manage seminaries
 Chairman of the Qom Seminary

References

See also

Hawza
List of Ayatollahs
Prosecutor-General of Iran
List of members in the Second Term of the Council of Experts
List of members in the Third Term of the Council of Experts
List of members in the Fourth Term of the Council of Experts
List of members in the Fifth Term of the Council of Experts

1935 births
Living people
Iranian ayatollahs
Members of the Assembly of Experts
Society of Seminary Teachers of Qom members
Shia clerics from Isfahan